John Hynden (fl. November 1414), of Wells, Somerset, was an English politician.

He was a Member (MP) of the Parliament of England for Wells in November 1414.

References

14th-century births
15th-century deaths
English MPs November 1414
People from Wells, Somerset